Laanemetsa is a village in Valga Parish, Valga County in southeastern Estonia. As of 2011 Census, the settlement's population was 65.

Gallery

References

Villages in Valga County
Kreis Werro